C++/CLI is a variant of the C++ programming language, modified for Common Language Infrastructure.  It has been part of Visual Studio 2005 and later, and provides interoperability with other .NET languages such as C#. Microsoft created C++/CLI to supersede Managed Extensions for C++. In December 2005, Ecma International published C++/CLI specifications as the ECMA-372 standard.

Syntax changes
C++/CLI should be thought of as a language of its own (with a new set of keywords, for example), instead of the C++ superset-oriented Managed C++ (MC++) (whose non-standard keywords were styled like  or ). Because of this, there are some major syntactic changes, especially related to the elimination of ambiguous identifiers and the addition of .NET-specific features.

Many conflicting syntaxes, such as the multiple versions of operator  in MC++, have been split: in C++/CLI, .NET reference types are created with the new keyword  (i.e. garbage collected new()). Also, C++/CLI has introduced the concept of generics from .NET (similar, for the most common purposes, to standard C++ templates, but quite different in their implementation).

Handles
In MC++, there were two different types of pointers:  pointers were normal C++ pointers, while  pointers worked on .NET reference types. In C++/CLI, however, the only type of pointer is the normal C++ pointer, while the .NET reference types are accessed through a "handle", with the new syntax  (instead of ). This new construct is especially helpful when managed and standard C++ code is mixed; it clarifies which objects are under .NET automatic garbage collection and which objects the programmer must remember to explicitly destroy.

Tracking references
A tracking reference in C++/CLI is a handle of a passed-by-reference variable. It is similar in concept to using "" (reference to a pointer) in standard C++, and (in function declarations) corresponds to the "" keyword applied to types in C#, or "" in Visual Basic .NET. C++/CLI uses a "" syntax to indicate a tracking reference to a handle.

The following code shows an example of the use of tracking references. Replacing the tracking reference with a regular handle variable would leave the resulting string array with 10 uninitialized string handles, as only copies of the string handles in the array would be set, due to them being passed by value rather than by reference.
int main()
{
    array<String^> ^arr = gcnew array<String^>(10);
    int i = 0;

    for each(String^% s in arr) {
        s = i++.ToString();
    }

    return 0;
}

Note that this would be illegal in C#, which does not allow  loops to pass values by reference. Hence, a workaround would be required.

Finalizers and automatic variables
Another change in C++/CLI is the introduction of the finalizer syntax , a special type of nondeterministic destructor that is run as a part of the garbage collection routine. The C++ destructor syntax  also exists for managed objects, and better reflects the "traditional" C++ semantics of deterministic destruction (that is, destructors that can be called by user code with ).

In the raw .NET paradigm, the nondeterministic destruction model overrides the protected  method of the root  class, while the deterministic model is implemented through the  interface method  (which the C++/CLI compiler turns the destructor into). Objects from C# or VB.NET code that override the Dispose method can be disposed of manually in C++/CLI with  just as .NET classes in C++/CLI can.

// C++/CLI
ref class MyClass
{
public:
    MyClass();  // constructor
    ~MyClass(); // (deterministic) destructor (implemented as IDisposable.Dispose())
protected:
    !MyClass(); // finalizer (non-deterministic destructor) (implemented as Finalize())

public:
    static void Test()
    {
        MyClass automatic; // Not a handle, no initialization: compiler calls constructor here
 
        MyClass ^user = gcnew MyClass();
        delete user;

        // Compiler calls automatic's destructor when automatic goes out of scope
    }
};

Operator overloading
Operator overloading works analogously to standard C++. Every * becomes a ^, every & becomes an %, but the rest of the syntax is unchanged, except for an important addition: for .NET classes, operator overloading is possible not only for classes themselves, but also for references to those classes. This feature is necessary to give a ref class the semantics for operator overloading expected from .NET ref classes. (In reverse, this also means that for .NET framework ref classes, reference operator overloading often is implicitly implemented in C++/CLI.)

For example, comparing two distinct String references (String^) via the operator == will give true whenever the two strings are equal. The operator overloading is static, however. Thus, casting to Object^ will remove the overloading semantics.

//effects of reference operator overloading
String ^s1 = "abc";
String ^s2 = "ab" + "c";
Object ^o1 = s1;
Object ^o2 = s2;
s1 == s2; // true
o1 == o2; // false

Interoperability
C++/CLI allows C++ programs to consume C# programs in C# DLLs.  Here the #using keyword shows the compiler where the DLL is located for its compilation metadata.  This simple example requires no data marshalling.
#include "stdafx.h"
using namespace System;
#using "...MyCS.dll"

int main(array<System::String ^> ^args) {
    double x = MyCS::Class1::add(40.1, 1.9);
    return 0;
}
The C# source code content of MyCS.dll.
namespace MyCS;

public class Class1 {
    public static double add(double a, double b) {
        return a + b;
    }
}
This examples shows how strings are marshalled from C++ strings to strings callable from C# then back to C++ strings.  String marshalling copies the string contents to forms usable in the different environments.
#include <string>
#include <iostream>
#include <msclr\marshal_cppstd.h>
#include "stdafx.h"
using namespace System;
#using "..MyCS.dll"

int main() {
	std::string s = "I am cat";
	System::String^ clrString = msclr::interop::marshal_as<System::String^>(s); // string usable from C#
	System::String^ t = MyCS::Class1::process(clrString); // call C# function
	std::string cppString = msclr::interop::marshal_as<std::string>(t); // string usable from C++
	std::cout << "Hello, C++/C# Interop!" << std::endl;
	std::cout << cppString << std::endl;
	return 0;
}
The C# code is not in any way C++-aware.
namespace MyCS;

public class Class1 {
    public static string process(string a) {
        return a.Replace("cat", "dog") + " with a tail";
    }
}
C++/C# interoperability allows C++ simplified access to the entire world of .NET features.

C++/CX
C++/CX targeting WinRT, although it produces entirely unmanaged code, borrows the ref and ^ syntax for the reference-counted components of WinRT, which are similar to COM "objects".

References

Further reading

External links
 
 Patent application regarding whitespace in keywords

.NET programming languages
C++ programming language family
Ecma standards
Microsoft Visual Studio